The Ice dancing competition of the 2020 Winter Youth Olympics is held at the Lausanne Skating Arena on 10 January (rhythm dance) and 13 January 2020 (free dance).

Results

Rhythm dance

Free dance

Overall

References 

Ice dancing